Pennsylvania Railroad District, also known as Conrail: Little Juniata River Bridges and Tunnels or Bridges and Tunnels (Spruce Creek to Birmingham Section, Little Juniata River), is a national historic district located in Spruce Creek Township, Morris Township, and Warriors Mark Township in Huntingdon County, Pennsylvania and Tyrone Township in Blair County, Pennsylvania. It consists of ten stone arch bridges, two parallel tunnels, and the right-of-way that links them. This  section had the most bridges and tunnels per mile to carry the Pennsylvania Railroad right-of-way. The bridges were built between 1886 and 1902, and are multiple semi-circular arch bridges built of stone ashlar.

It was listed on the National Register of Historic Places in 1990.

References 

Tunnels in Pennsylvania
Railroad bridges on the National Register of Historic Places in Pennsylvania
Bridges completed in 1902
Bridges in Huntingdon County, Pennsylvania
Historic districts on the National Register of Historic Places in Pennsylvania
National Register of Historic Places in Blair County, Pennsylvania
National Register of Historic Places in Huntingdon County, Pennsylvania
Stone arch bridges in the United States